Anna Brzezińska is the name of:

 Anna Brzezińska (athlete) (born 1971), Polish middle-distance runner
 Anna Brzezińska (writer) (born 1971), Polish fantasy author